The feminine beauty ideal is a specific set of beauty standards regarding traits that are ingrained in women throughout their lives and from a young age to increase their perceived physical attractiveness. It is a phenomenon experienced by many women in the world, though the traits change over time and vary in country and culture.

Feminine beauty ideals are mainly rooted in heteronormative beliefs, but they heavily influence women of all sexual orientations. The feminine beauty ideal traits include but are not limited to: female body shape, facial feature, skin tones, height, clothing style, hairstyle and body weight. In order to emulate said desirable traits, women have chosen to undergo facial and body-altering practices which range in severity. Some of these practices include: plastic surgery, skin bleaching, foot binding, neck rings, hair removal, makeup, wig installations, teeth lacquering, tanning, corsetry, etc.

With fairy tales, mass media, advertisements, fashion and beauty-centered dolls such as Barbie dolls playing a prominent role in women's lives, it adds to the pressure to conform to the feminine beauty ideal starting from a young age. Handling the pressure to conform to a certain definition of "beautiful" can have psychological effects on an individual, such as depression, eating disorders, body dysmorphia and low self-esteem that start from an adolescent age and continue into adulthood.   

From an evolutionary perspective, some perceptions of feminine beauty ideals correlate with fertility and health.

Cultural ideals

General

In Myanmar, Kayan Lahwi girls from the age of about five years have metal rings put around their necks. Additional rings are added to the girl's neck every two years. This practice is done to produce a giraffe-like effect in women by gradually deforming the clavicles and placement of the ribs through the weight of the rings to create the impression of a longer neck. These women would eventually carry up to 24 rings around their necks. This tradition has been declining among the younger generations as Myanmar continues to modernise.

The practice of foot binding in China involved a girl's feet being bound at age six to create the "ideal" image of feet. The girl's feet were bound to become 1/3 the original size, which crippled the woman, but also gave her a very high social status and was much admired. After the revolution of 1911, this practice of foot binding was ended. The idea of what is considered the ideal of beauty for women varies across different cultural ideals and practices.

The practise of skin whitening is common amongst women in South Asia, the Americas and Africa, while sun tanning, indoor tanning and self tanning is common among white women in the Western world. In modern times, fitting the now-widespread Eurocentric beauty standard confers greater privileges in many Southeast Asian and African societies, but the preference for light skin in Asia is actually not a result of European colonialism and has instead been a part of society since long before any contact. These beauty standards have also resulted in the creation of skin whitening and bleaching industries in Asian and African countries, including Ghana. Discrimination based on skin colour, also referred to as colourism, has been described by scholars as being conceptualized by deeming lighter-skinned individuals as superior in terms of beauty and responsibility compared to their darker-skinned counterparts. Favouritism based on colourism in terms of social and economic distributions of power was based on systems implemented during the colonisation of Africa by European powers, which established Eurocentric beauty standards. 

However, the colonization of non-white countries by European migrants sometimes led to the establishment of reverse-colorism, such as in the Dutch Indonesia, where Dutch white male colonists defined beauty standards that ranked mixed-race Southeast Asian women as more attractive than white women, on the basis of their darker skin and black hair color. Some studies using Caucasian male subjects from Western countries have identified a preference for women with darker skin, which indicates that there is no innate preference for lighter skin within the West. This has led some researchers to propose that Western culture may be unique in having a cultural preference for darker women. Some studies from Western countries have found that, among young women, those with a tanner skin color have higher self-perceived attractiveness.

Southeast Asian women

Dutch Indonesia
In the Dutch East Indies, now Indonesia, the feminine beauty ideal created by white male colonists was for women to have a brown skin color and black hair. In the 1920s, an American consul wrote a letter to the United States Secretary of State in which he observed that white European Dutch men in colonial Indonesia preferred to marry local women of color over Dutch white women, primarily because of the brown skin and darker hair of Indonesian women was considered more beautiful than the "pallid, anemic" complexion of white Dutch women. The frequency at which young Dutch men married Indo women was considered embarrassing to the conservative element of Dutch society. The legacy of this inter-racial beauty ideal continues to be reflected in local literature, as it was written in a popular novel that "a golden colored skin is the greatest gift Allah can
bestow upon a woman", in reference to a blond haired girl who did not inherit her grandmother's complexion.

East Asian women

China 
In China, similar to South Korea, pale skin is seen as desirable. A classic folk saying originated from Zhang Dai, literally translates to "pale skin covers a hundred flaws".

Historically, Tang Dynasty women with a plump figure were considered the standardized view of beauty, contrasting with the expectations of tall, slim figures of today.

Beauty is often used as a popular subject in Chinese literature and poetry. Historically, beauty did not necessarily relate solely to the appearance of a person's figure, and the criteria of being beautiful stretched beyond looks. An example of this would be the association of nobility with beauty and being poor or of peasant status with being ugly. Famous Chinese beauties portrayed in historical literature almost always come from a noble or middle-class status, and depictions often portray them as court ladies or servants of court ladies, garbed with glamorous feminine clothing to represent their identity. Women that did not fit the social status necessary to wear such clothing, such as commoners, were eliminated in terms of depictions of beautiful women.

Japan 
Though sharing some aspects of Confucian culture with China, beauty standards between China and Japan have differed historically. Dating back to the Heian period (794–1185), Japanese court ladies would colour the teeth black (a practice known as ) upon reaching adulthood. This custom was practiced by the nobility, samurai clans and could be seen at a large number of temples,} but was not generally seen among commoners. The practice of teeth blackening lasted until the Meiji Restoration (1868).

Hair had to be at least long enough to touch the ground when seated.

Scholar and art critic Okakura Kakuzō delivered in his compilations of lectures in 1905, that the considerable bases of beauty for modern Japan is:

Research suggests that Japanese beauty ideals may be affected more by individuality than Korean or Chinese culture. Japanese people are more likely to incorporate anti-aesthetics, incompleteness, uncertainty, pluralism, and deconstruction of what is considered to be 'beautiful' which is against the normal Japanese beauty standard which was based on aesthetics. This is allowing Japanese women to embrace their 'flaws' that society used to turn against them and to instead use their features and embrace the uniqueness of one's moles, birthmarks, eye shape, teeth shape and various facial elements. In the late 20th century, the emergence of the ganguro and gyaru sub-cultures was considered an act of rebellion and against the Japanese feminine beauty ideal. These trends were characterized by spray tans, dyed blonde or orange hair color, and brightly colored contact lenses. Women who adopted these fashion trends faced extreme social pressures from family members and punishment from school authorities, leading some to drop out of school and enter the labor force at a young age.

South Korea 
South Korea is known for its often stringent beauty standards, which have resulted in the notable development of the Korean skincare industry. South Korean beauty standards are defined by a "very pale skin, big eyes with double eyelids, a tiny nose with a high nose bridge, and rosebud lips", a small face and subtly-pointed chin.

Between 1990 and 2006, the number of surgeries specializing in plastic surgery in South Korea grew to the total rate of 8.9 percent per year, where the majority fraction undergoing these procedures were young people. A survey in 2004 showed that out of 1,565 female students attending college, 25.4 percent of them had undergone plastic surgery for double eyelids, 3.6 percent for nose, and 1 percent for jaw/cheekbone. Polling from 2015 in South Korea indicates that as many as 30% of young women age 19-29 may have undergone plastic surgery in South Korea.  Due to the rise of idol culture, beauty aesthetics in South Korea have undergone drastic changes, where women relate beauty with professional success. In workplaces, women are expected to be physical attractive; headshots are required when submitting resumes to some companies, and the appearance of female applicants is often scrutinized, with professional skill and physical beauty idealized.  

In addition to idol culture, researchers have found that due to South Korea's hypercompetitive society, Korean women have gradually come to believe that they could achieve more from superior beauty even though they may have a limited amount of social resources. In a research study done, it was found that Korean women associated beauty with having an easier time searching for jobs, finding spouses and higher income levels. There is also a concept called the halo effect in Korea, where being beautiful and being smart leads to the ultimate level of beauty. If a woman is considered to be smart, by attending a prestigious university like Seoul National University, and up to South Korea's strict beautiful standards, she is considered to be "untouchable" and "no one can beat her".

The latest 'activist'-like movement that young girls in South Korea are promoting is called the "pro-ana" movement, young girls will go onto various websites and social media outlets to promote behaviours related to eating disorder anorexia, such as how to throw away lunch at school without getting in trouble with the staff members at school and how to not get caught by parents. A majority of the girls who are involved in this movement are not eating properly and starving themselves until their weight drops to a fragile amount of 30 to 40 kilograms. Individuals who are extremists about losing weight will take vast amounts of constipation pills to flush food out of their system quickly, as the lack of nutrition will cause them to lose weight drastically. On the rare occasions where girls will eat a proper meal, they feel guilty for indulging, so they will turn to bulimic tendencies and force themselves to vomit to maintain their thin shape.

In Korea, psychotropic appetite suppressants also increased in popularity by 31.5 percent from 93.2 billion won (US$77.4 million) in 2014 to 122.5 billion won (US$102.8 million) in 2018, while the sales in non-psychotropic appetite suppressants rose 126.8 percent from 34.9 billion won (US$29.3 million) to 79.1 billion won (US$66 million) during the same time. The long-term use of psychotropic appetite suppressants increases the risk of side effects such as pulmonary hypertension and severe heart disease. This, in combination with the lack of nutrients that girls receive due to anorexic tendencies can cause malnutrition, osteoporosis, heart disease and hair loss. Taking into account that it is more harmful to teenagers as their brains and bodies are still in development, their extreme dieting happens can lead to irregular menstruation, loss of menstruation, stunted growth, and in extreme cases, death.

The main problem with girls who are active in the pro-ana movement is that they themselves are not unaware of the risk of anorexia. They know that anorexia is a disease, but believe their actions are justified due to the culture that they live in, a culture that harshly criticizes the perceived beauty of individuals based on their body shape.

South Asia 
The idea of beauty standards in South Asia has had a long history with fair skin tone. The normative societal expectation of beauty of people has been associated with the gradient of their skin colour. The fairer one becomes, the more attractive they are. Fairness is also a tool of belongingness and social acceptance within the dominant society. Whiteness is the most ideal beauty standard of coloured women in South Asia.

French women
There have been multiple beauty ideals for women in France. Brântome lists as many as thirty things are needed to make
a woman beautiful, A common but rigid ideal might include supposed Brântome's "three white things". These "things" or traits refer to skin, teeth, and hands. There are also the "three black things", including the color of the person's eyes, eyebrows and eyelashes. This leaves three other areas to embark on, including the cheeks, lips, and nails. This beauty standard also was noted to pull from "sections on alchemy, medicine, astrology, cooking and the art of looking beautiful" 

According to Wandering Pioneer, beauty standards in France seem to concern someone's style rather than the body shape. In addition, the French approach to beauty is about enhancing natural features rather than achieving a specific look. 
According to some dermatologists, looking young is not a beauty criterion. Instead, women want to look toned and their skin to look firm.

Black women 

Black women in the United States have the highest rates of being overweight or obese, as well as the highest Body Mass Index (BMI) levels. Despite this conflicting with the dominant thin beauty ideal, studies have found black women to be generally more tolerant of heavier body weights compared to women of other groups, and black women additionally often underestimate the size of their own bodies. A curvaceous physique consisting of well-rounded buttocks, hips, and thighs is often perceived by black women to be highly attractive and desirable. Curvier bodies are also seen as attractive in the Caribbean, and they are known as the "Coca-cola bottle" body. 

Historically, the stereotypically larger buttocks of black women result in unique scrutiny, such as the 19th century case of Sarah Baartman, a black woman who achieved notoriety for the size of her buttocks, which both aroused and repelled white men and women. Although white society viewed such women as "savage" and "wild", there was also an enchantment and sense of eroticization of this body type. White women of that era adopted fashions that created the impression of large buttocks, and this body type continues to be considered attractive in American society. A considerable number of women get buttocks implants to fulfill this beauty ideal, with the number of procedures nearly doubling from 2014 and 2015. While the curvy body type often subjects black women to negative stigma, it is often deemed trendy on non-black women. 

As racial minorities in the United States, African Americans were historically pressured by white beauty ideals that conflict with their own  natural features and beauty ideals. Paradoxically, Makkar and Strube observe that modern-day black women view themselves more favorably than white women, and are less likely than them to pursue the conventional beauty ideal. Makkar and Strube asked black women with both low and high self esteem to judge themselves in relation to images of white and black supermodels. Both low and high-self esteem black women rated themselves as more attractive than the white models, but less attractive than the black models, however women with stronger black identity perceived themselves as substantially more attractive. The authors found that black women who have a stronger sense of black identity were less likely to be impacted by external beauty ideals than were black women with a weaker sense of black identity, which suggests an explicit rejection of white beauty standards.

Colourism can be defined as the discrimination or unjust treatment of people within the same racial or ethnic group or community based on the shade of one's colour. Colourism can also affect Latin Americans, East Asians, South Asians, and even Europeans, leading to complexion discrimination. One of the major Eurocentric features that is desired by society in black women is lighter skin colour. Terms such as "redbone", "yellowbone", or "light skin" have been used in films, rap songs, and other forms of entrainment to describe "beautiful" or "desirable" black women, especially in the black African American communities. Due to the fact that lighter-skinned African Americans are more desired, they tend to have more social and political privileges and advantages that dark African Americans do not. On the other hand, darker-skinned individuals, culturally and ethnically are often viewed as authentic or legitimate compared to lighter-skinned people. Darker African Americans are seen as black with little to no doubt, while lighter-skinned African Americans are most likely questioned or not seen as entirely black. 
Colourism in the United States dates back to during slavery, where lighter-skinned men or women were required to work indoors while the darker-skinned individuals were to work out on the fields. The shade of their skin colour determined their job as well as the treatment they were to receive.

In the documentary film titled "Dark Girls", interviews of black women in the documentary shine light on the unspoken about topic of colourism. Experiences and experiments mentioned in the film conclude how women of darker skin suffered socially, mentally, and personally. Some of the women in the film mention how they did not see themselves as beautiful because of their darker skin.

In "Flash of the Spirit", they discuss the ancient beauty ideals for African women. The ideals were there were no ideals. Beauty was rarely accepted if you were "too perfect" or "overly handsome". Being "too much" of something was a red flag because it threw off the spectrum according to Yoruba society. It was called "iwontunwonsi". This is the total opposite of what the standards for society are today because they set a middle ground to compare people to, yet the middle ground consists of high standards.

Black women and women of colour, on many platforms and forms of representation, have been whitewashed. Whitewashing of black women is not only limited to whitening black individuals' skin tones, but also giving them straight hair textures and Eurocentric features. Magazines and beauty companies have been criticized for whitewashing the images of black female celebrities on covers and advertisements, mostly photoshopping them with lighter skin.

When it comes to racial disparities within the beauty industry, like makeup artists and beauty-related YouTube content creators, the impact of Eurocentric representation and beauty ideals are apparent. A study conducted in 2020 by researchers Tran and Copes revealed that Black women who were online beauty content creators had lower salaries, fewer brand endorsements, more difficulty receiving sponsorships and a significantly slower rise to popularity compared to White online beauty content creators. This is likely due to the lack of Black representation when it comes to the Eurocentric beauty ideal as well as the notion of colourism playing a role for Black online beauty content creators.

Additionally, research done by Marway found that the beauty norm for fair skin limits career goals and opportunities for Black women and women of colour, as they practice self-censorship when applying for jobs because they have an expectation that they will not be chosen to play lead roles in a workplace due to the disproportionate racial portrayals in various professions.

Skin color

History 
South Asia was ruled by the Mughals and the British. Along with the impact of globalization and the influence of Hollywood, it made society believe that fairness was associated with success and superiority. In earlier Hollywood movies, people with dark skin tones were not given a lead role but instead were chosen to play the villain or subordinate roles. This melanin power dynamic caused a rift and discrimination among people solely based on their skin colour.

Even before the British came and ruled all over South Asia, the Indian subcontinent was also ruled by a long list of fair-skinned rulers, which included people from Arabs to Mughals, who had a lighter skin tone than the majority of Indians. The origins of fair skin colour as an appropriate beauty ideal originated from deeply ingrained sociocultural biases such as class differences that date back to colonial times. The post-colonial impact after the 'British Raj' was tremendous on the impressionable minds of the people of South Asia. Physical characteristics like lighter skin tone were glorified and deemed to be a crucial instrument of social status and power. Skin colour played a significant role in labelling people based on the caste system. People in the upper caste system were associated with light skin whereas lower caste people were identified as 'dark skin'. South Asian beauty norms quickly absorbed the idea of the correlation between increased social acceptance with decreased melanin.

Ideals among young women 
The portrayal of dark-skinned women across media promising a lighter skin tone with the use of fairness products has gained a lot of attention. 'Fairer' skin is viewed as a beauty aesthetic ideal disproportionately targeted at women in India. The skin colour of many young females is perceived as an obstacle to social mobility. The preference for lighter skin tones has been perpetrated by exposure to idealized images conveyed in visual media, as well as through discriminatory practices that favour lighter skin tones. In India, it is a common belief that fair skin and beauty go hand in hand, leading to successful marriages and successful careers, while darker-skinned Indian girls are shamed and compared to their lighter-skinned peers.

Many South Asian families face insecurities around the fact that they have a darker-skinned daughter compared to themselves. That is when they tend to refer to their child as having a 'wheatish skin complexion' when society labels them as 'dark-skinned'. This is a common term to refer to South Asian women with brown skin and it also tends to satisfy the social insecurities of the parents. There are many traditional ideas which are referred to as 'grandma sayings of fairness home remedies' which are still prevalent in the South Asian community. These practices consist of using a mixture of gram flour and turmeric powder to lighten one's skin tone. Such ideas bring a lot of discomfort and self-confidence doubts among young women. Nonetheless, these ideas have also promoted the use of fairness creams. Many regions in South Asia still believe in the practices of arranged marriage and women who are dark-skinned face higher rejection. In terms of marriage, choices, and life outcomes, fair-skinned women are in a better position than those with darker complexions, since light skin is traded for a less expensive dowry.

Sources of ideals

Advertisements 
Advertising is driving several definitions of beauty around the world today where an ideal woman is depicted as tall, thin, and white. Models often set a standard of beauty for audiences by endorsing various products and displaying perfect portions of their bodies. Hyper-commercialized facial products like Fair and Handsome and Fair and Lovely were in trend in the South Asian society until very recently. For women, products like Glow & Lovely were not only a marker of social acceptance but also an emotional strength, making them 'happy and confident'. Multi-billion-dollar skin lightening products have grown throughout the world in part because of colourism, as millions of people of colour, most of whom are women, purchase and use products intended to permanently lighten their skin. Skin whitening products are also known as skin bleaching products and come in creams, gels, and lotions that are directly applied to the skin. According to estimates, the market size for 'fairness' creams and lotions in India is about US$450 million. A growth rate of 15 to 20% is reported each year for 'fairness' products.

Similarly, the pattern of fair skin obsession has percolated as a desirable quality for South Asian men. For instance, skin whitening products have been established as a marker of masculinity and deemed as a desirable beauty standard for men in West Nepal.

Women who already face oppression because of their gender encounter another obstacle in the way of their progress where fairness is seen as key to success. There is a strong association between being fair and being beautiful in India, and white skin is often seen as an obsession, making fairness the epitome of an acceptable physical feature. Simultaneously, women with a dark skin tone are constantly exposed to ideas such as 'dark is ugly', which makes them a great 'significant burden' on their families.

Mass media

Mass media is one of the most powerful tools for young girls and women to learn and also understand feminine beauty ideals. As mass media develops, the way people see feminine beauty ideals changes, as does how females view themselves. "The average teen girl gets about 180 minutes of media exposure daily and only about 10 minutes of parental interaction a day," says Renee Hobbs, EdD, associate professor of communications at Temple University. In most advertisements, female models are typically homogeneous in appearance. "Girls today are swamped by [ultra-thin] ideals not only in the form of dolls but also in comics, cartoons, TV, and advertising along with all the associated merchandising." In addition to this, the feminine beauty ideal in the mass media is manipulated by technology. Images of women can be virtually manipulated creating an ideal that is not only rare but also nonexistent. The Encyclopedia of Gender in the Media states that "the postproduction techniques of airbrushing and computer-generated modifications 'perfect' the beauty myth by removing any remaining blemishes or imperfections visible to the eye." Advertisements for products "such as diets, cosmetics, and exercise gear [help] the media construct a dream world of hopes and high standards that incorporates the glorification of slenderness and weight loss."

With a focus on an ideal physical appearance, the feminine beauty ideal distracts from female competency by prioritizing and valuing superficial characteristics related to beauty and appearance. When physical beauty is idealized and featured in the media, it reduces women to sexualized objects. This creates the message across mass media that one's body is inadequate apart from sex appeal and connects concepts of beauty and sex.

Perfection is achieved by celebrities through photoshopped images that hide every blemish or flaw while also editing body parts to create the ideal hourglass body type. The Dove Beauty and Confidence Report interviewed 10,500 females across thirteen countries and found that women's confidence in their body image is steadily declining – regardless of age or geographic location. Despite these findings, there is a strong desire to fight existing beauty ideals. In fact, 71% of women and 67% of girls want the media to do a better job of portraying different types of women. Studies done by Dove reveal low self-esteem impacts women and girls' ability to release their true potential. 85% of women and 79% of girls admit they opt out of important life activities when they do not feel confident in the way they look. More than half of women (69%) and girls (65%) allude to pressure from the media and advertisements to become the world's version of beautiful, which is a driving force of appearance anxiety. Studies done by Dove have also revealed the following statistics: "4% of women consider themselves beautiful, 11% of girls globally are comfortable with describing themselves as beautiful, 72% of girls feel pressure to be beautiful, 80% of women agree that every woman has something about her that is beautiful, but do not see their own beauty, and that 54% of women agree that when it comes to how they look, they are their own worst beauty critic."

An online space such as Instagram that is based on interactions through pictures creates a focus on one's physical appearance. According to evidence gathered from a study focusing on general Instagram use in young women, researchers suggest Instagram usage was positively correlated with women's self-objectification. This same study also considered the effect of Instagram on the internalization of the Western beauty ideal for women, and the evidence gathered in the study agrees with the idea that Instagram use encourages women to internalize the societal beauty ideal of Western culture. Because users have the opportunity to shape and edit their photographs before sharing them, they can force them to adhere to the beauty ideal. Viewing these carefully selected pictures shows the extent to which women internalize the Western beauty ideal. In addition to researching the effects of general Instagram use, the study also researched the effects of "fitspiration" Instagram pages on young women's body image. "Fitspiration" pages aim to motivate the viewer through images of healthy eating and exercising. Although these pages aim to be a positive way to promote a healthy lifestyle, they are also appearance-based and contain images of toned and skinny women. According to the study, there is a positive correlation to young women's viewing "fitspiration" pages and a negative body image.

A case study conducted about Instagram use and the Western feminine beauty ideal focused on the specific account @effyourbeautystandards, a body-positive Instagram page created by feminist plus-size model Tess Holliday. Through her page, Holliday instructed women to share pictures of themselves on Instagram with the hashtag #effyourbeautystandards. Images posted with this hashtag would be selected by the account administrators and posted to the @effyourbeauutystandards page. The evidence gathered in this case study suggested that while these selected pictures attempt to take an intersectional approach to the content women view on social media, they may still have an effect on how women view their bodies.

Social media such as Snapchat, Instagram, and TikTok may promote unrealistic beauty standards for women and teenage girls for various reasons. A large part of this may be due to the use of photoshop and heavy filters that change one's facial structure and features. When there is such a large influx of content catered to achieving a certain beauty standard it can leave many feel dissatisfied with their own.

Taking selfies is something that's pretty standard among social media platforms, but even that can negatively effect someone's self esteem. A study published by Jennifer Mills- a professor at York University in Toronto found that in general, women felt more self conscious after taking a selfie than they did prior. She had two groups that were instructed to take a selfie and post it online; one was only allowed to take one selfie while the other was able to take unlimited and edit them. Both groups were left with the same result despite the differing circumstances. There was always a factor they felt dissatisfied with whether it was the lighting, how their face looked, the angle, etc. Another factor was validation from others whether it was approving the selfie or looking at likes and comments.

Fairy tales
The feminine beauty ideal is portrayed in many children's fairy tales. It has been common in the Brothers Grimm fairy tales for physical attractiveness in female characters to be rewarded. In those fairy tales, "beauty is often associated with being white, economically privileged, and virtuous."

The Brothers Grimm fairy tales usually involve a beautiful heroine. In the story Snow White, the protagonist Snow White is described as having "skin as white as snow, lips as red as blood, and hair as black as ebony wood" and as being "beautiful as the light of day." By contrast, the antagonist of Brothers Grimm fairy tales is frequently described as old and physically unattractive, relating beauty with youth and goodness, and ugliness with aging and evil. Ultimately, this correlation puts an emphasis on the virtue of being beautiful, as defined by Grimm fairy tales.

Starting almost 100 years after the Grimm Brothers wrote their fairy tales, the Walt Disney Animation Studios adapted these tales into animated feature films. Other common traits of female Disney characters are thin bodies with impossible bodily proportions, long, flowing hair, and large, round eyes. The constant emphasis on female beauty and what constitutes as being beautiful contributes to the overall feminine beauty ideal.

Fashion and beauty-centred dolls
Throughout the world, fashion and beauty-centred dolls such as Barbie dolls are making their way into the lives of many young girls, perpetuating unrealistic beauty standards from looking at the physique of the Barbie dolls to the lack of diversity in the product line in terms of race and gender of Barbie dolls. From 2012 to 2020, the sale of Barbie dolls worldwide was 99.1 billion U.S. dollars.

When young girls are playing with fashion and beauty-centred dolls, they begin to idealize beauty standards and associate what they find "beautiful" in the doll with attributes that they feel that they need to uphold. At first glance, Barbie dolls look glamorous, with endless accessories, perfectly platinum straight blond hair, pink shiny lips, tiny waist, long legs, pointed toes and pink sparkly outfits. Girls who played with Barbie dolls reported lower body image and a greater desire to be thinner than the girls who played with a curvier doll or no doll at all.

When taking Barbie's "beautiful" proportions and translating that physique into an actual human, Barbie is estimated to be 5'9" (175 cm) tall, have a 39" bust, an 18" waist, 33" hips, children's size 3 feet, and her weight would be 110 pounds (50 kg). Taking into consideration Barbie's 'human' height and weight, Barbie would have a Body Mass Index (BMI) of 16.24; this number fits the weight criteria for anorexia. Additionally, being below a BMI of 17 suggests that an individual cannot afford to lose more weight as it is detrimental to one's health and that they are severely underweight. Continuously playing with fashion and beauty-centred dolls with such idealistic body proportions can cause psychological effects to an individual and can later stem into the development of eating disorders.

LGBT ideals

Transgender Women 
Transmisogyny and the risk factors of sexual violence is discussed in Crossing boundaries and fetishization: Experiences of sexual violence for trans women of color. To quote the author(s): "Trans women gave accounts of using makeup, clothes, and hormones to [pass as] women. However, many said that they had difficulties in passing as a "pretty girl" or "beautiful woman" within the confines of archetypal White femininity, which was seen as the ideal, because of the "confines or bounds" of the "physical body," including body hair, size, scarring, or having "brown" skin. This left them vulnerable to sexual violence as visibly trans women." This research article also focuses on the fetishization and Sexualization trans women of color face that may differ from the archetypal white women's experience. Their research suggests that the poor health outcomes experienced by many trans women are closely associated with their exposure to sexual violence as well as the social inequities and transphobia to which they are subjected. Trans women of color experience additional prejudice and Discrimination due to the intersection of gender, sexuality, race, and social class. Swami's research also suggests that understanding these intersectionalities is vital in understanding the sexual violence experiences of trans women of color.

The construction of femininity within the transgender community largely has to do with how well (or how poorly) they are able to utilise the tools of "corporeal beautification provided by the commercial industries."  More "acceptable" trans women, such as Caitlyn Jenner, play off of Western beauty ideals and receive overwhelming support from the masses. "Trans women such as Jenner are accepted as women so long as they adhere to the visual codes of female attractiveness." The juxtaposition of Caitlyn Jenner's praise and a person of color's rejection in response to their transition shows not only how race and class play a role in acceptance/idolization, but also how the feminine beauty ideal is viewed as authentic only if it is achieved through corporeal alterations.

Drag Queens 

Drag queens are performers that are usually male, but there are some non binary and trans women queens. These performers dress up as women typically for entertainment purposes. Many steps are taken to achieve such personas, like wearing prosthetic breasts and corsets to mimic an hourglass figure. Studies have shown that queer people (though not specifically drag queens) tend to have greater body image issues than to non queer individuals. Drag personas vary; however, those intending to present in a more traditionally feminine way are more vulnerable to these body image issues. This can be seen in media, for example: RuPaul's Drag Race, a show that features a competition between drag queens. Contestants from season five admitted to battling eating disorders as they feel a burden to look traditionally feminine. From the show, researchers have noted that drag queens who have a smaller/skinnier body type are treated as though their femininity is more valid than larger drag queens. RuPaul's Drag Race has also been known to encourage racialized performances that play into stereotypes based on the ethnicity of the queens performing; one incidence, a queen was discouraged from putting on an Amy Winehouse performance because the queen herself was a person of color. Although drag is an important part of the LGBTQ community, most of the inspiration from which drag queens draw to formulate their looks abides by the standard of heteronormative, western beauty.

Psychological effects
Feminine beauty ideals have shown correlations to many psychological disorders, including lowered self-esteem and eating disorders. Western cultural standards of beauty and attractiveness promote unhealthy and unattainable body ideals that motivate women to seek perfection. Since 1972, there has been a dramatic increase in the percentage of women in the United States who experience dissatisfaction with their bodies. Research indicates that women's exposure to television, even for a very short time, can experience decreased mood and self-esteem. It has been consistently found that perceived appearance is the single strongest predictor of global self-esteem among young adults. Awareness of the ideal female shape is linked to increasingly negative self-esteem. Through peer interaction and an environment of continual comparison to those portrayed in the media, women are often made to feel inadequate, and thus their self-esteem can decrease from their negative self-image. A negative body image can result in adverse psychosocial consequences, including depression, poor self-esteem, and diminished quality of life.
 
There is significant pressure for girls to conform to feminine beauty ideals, and, since thinness is prized as feminine, many women feel dissatisfied with their body shape. Body dissatisfaction has been found to be a precursor to serious psychological problems such as depression, social anxiety, and eating disorders. The feminine beauty ideal has influenced women, particularly younger women, to partake in extreme measures. Some of these extreme measures include limiting their food intake and participating in excessive physical activity to try to achieve what is considered the "ideal beauty standards". One aspect of the feminine beauty ideal includes having a thin waist, which is causing women to participate in these alarming behaviors. When trying to achieve these impossible standards, these dangerous practices are put into place. These practices can eventually lead to the woman developing eating disorders such as anorexia and bulimia. As achieving the "beauty ideal" becomes a more popular phenomenon, these eating disorders are becoming more prevalent, especially in young women. Researchers have found that magazine advertisements promoting dieting and thinness are far more prevalent in women's magazine than in men's magazine, and that female television characters are far more likely to be thin than male characters. Eating disorders stem from individual body dysmorphia, or an excessive preoccupation with perceived flaws in appearance. Researchers suggest that this behavior strongly correlates with societal pressure for women to live up to the standards of beauty set by a culture obsessed with being thin. Research has shown that people have subconsciously associated heavier body sizes with negative personality characteristics such as laziness and lack of self-control. Fat-body prejudice appears as young as early childhood and continues into adult years. The problem of negative body image worsens as females go through puberty; girls in adolescence frequently report being dissatisfied with their weight and fear future weight gain. According to the National Association of Anorexia Nervosa and Associated Disorders (ANAD), the age of the onset of eating disorders is getting younger. Girls as young as elementary-school age report body dissatisfaction and dieting in order to look like magazine models.

Ellen Staurowsky characterized serious psychological and physical health risks associated with girls' negative body images. Negative body image is often associated with disordered eating, depression, and even substance abuse. There is widespread evidence of damaging dissatisfaction among women and young girls with their appearance.

Evolutionary perspectives
Ideas of feminine beauty may have originated from features that correlate with fertility and health. These features include a figure where there is more fat distribution in the hip and thigh area, and vary between different cultures. In both Western and Eastern cultures, having a larger waist to hip ratio (WHR) is considered attractive. While it has been shown consistently that men find women with larger WHR more attractive, this body feature does not actually show any indication of health or fertility. It is more agreeably hypothesized that attraction to WHR is an adaptive cue of parity or current pregnancy, rather than a cue of fertility. The heterosexual evolutionary perspective suggests that men, over time and across cultures, prefer youthful features (smooth skin, white eyes, full lips, good muscle tone, leg length, lumbar curvature, facial symmetry, long/full hair, feminine voice) as indications of fertility or healthy genes. These physical cues pair with behavior cues of youth (high energy, short stride, animated facial expressions) to ancestrally assess a woman's "reproductive value." These theories can help us understand why certain beauty/body trends fluctuate or remain stagnant, but it is important to remember that "unsound theoretical foundations will lead to imprecise predictions which cannot properly be tested, thus ultimately resulting in the premature rejection of an evolutionary explanation to human mate preferences."

Gallery

References

Female beauty
Recurrent elements in fairy tales
Body image in popular culture
Social constructionism